Whangārei Airport  is an airport  to the south east of Whangārei city, in the suburb of Onerahi, on the east coast of Northland in the North Island of New Zealand. The airport has a single terminal with two gates.

History
The first aerodrome in Whangārei was located on Pohe Island in the upper reaches of Whangārei Harbour. Sir Charles Kingsford Smith's aircraft, the Southern Cross, landed on Pohe Island in 1928. This airstrip was not of high quality due to it being built on boggy reclaimed land, so a more suitable site was required. Another site was considered, at Kensington Park, but in May 1939 the current site was opened at Onerahi.

With the outbreak of World War II, immediately after the establishment of the airfield, the airport was taken over by the RNZAF to serve as a training base which became RNZAF Station Onerahi. Flight Lieutenant "Lou" Gates became one of the station commanders. Pilots practised bombing raids on the nearby Matakohe Island and Rat Island. The airport was established with three grass runways. No. 20 Squadron RNZAF was formed there in August 1942 with Hawker Hind biplanes, personnel and aircraft provided from No. 6 (AC) Squadron RNZAF at Milson, Palmerston North. The squadron was disbanded in July 1943 but reformed elsewhere later in the war. The station was reduced to two runways (06/24 and 32/14) shortly after the war and converted for public use. Some of the old airforce barracks are still present today, having been converted into residential properties.

National Airways Corporation (NAC) began twice-daily commercial flights between Whangārei and Auckland in 1948 using Lockheed Electra 10-seat aircraft. NAC replaced the Electra in March 1950 with small de Havilland Dominie 6-seat aircraft as the airport was too small to handle the new Lockheed Lodestar. The de Havilland's small size meant it serviced Whangārei with six return flights daily from Auckland. 10,148 people flew to and from Whangārei in 1950. The 06/24 runway was upgraded and sealed in December 1963 to its current length of 1097m, which allowed NAC to commence commercial flights with the much larger DC3s. A new airport terminal was built on the northern side of the main runway to cater for future growth. A new control tower was also built. The larger capacity of the DC3 meant Whangārei was serviced only twice-daily to Auckland, with some flights continuing north onwards to Kaikohe or other Northland airports.

In August 1970, NAC replaced its DC-3 service to Whangārei with larger Fokker Friendships. Northern Districts Aero Club introduced a twice-daily return air taxi service to compete and provide additional frequency to Auckland on each Monday, Wednesday and Friday. The service, which operated under the name of Executive Air Taxis, started on 21 August 1970 using a newly imported Piper Cherokee Six. This service proved to be popular and was expanded by the end of 1974 to offer a twice-daily Monday to Friday morning and afternoon return services to Auckland. Northern Districts Aero Club was able to fund new clubrooms and a hangar in 1977.

In 1988, NAC's successor Air New Zealand announced the withdrawal of its twice-daily Friendship service in favour of its newly purchased subsidiary Eagle Airways offering up to five Embraer Bandeirante flights a day. This led to the decline and eventual end of the Northern Districts Aero Club scheduled flights to Auckland. The control tower was closed in 1988 as the airport was deemed too small to continue the service.

In 1991, a new airline, Ansett New Zealand, began flying to Whangārei in competition with Air New Zealand. Both airlines flew Bandeirantes, with Ansett also flying Dash 8s. The terminal was upgraded due to this growth.

In September 1998, Ansett New Zealand withdrew its service. To help meet the demand for additional seats, Eagle Airways increased its services by 14 per week to bring the number of Bandeirante flights to Whangārei to 69. This compared with Air New Zealand's previous service of 14 Friendship flights a week.

In 2001, Eagle Airways purchased 16 new Beechcraft 1900D aircraft and begun using this aircraft on all routes, retiring the Bandeirante aircraft. It was able to introduce new services with the improved aircraft and in 2002 begun direct flights linking Whangārei to Wellington. This service operated twice every week day (until 2009 when it was reduced to one) and was Eagle Airways' longest regular flight service at 626 km (90 minutes).

In 2007, Sunair begun daily air services between Whangārei, Tauranga, Rotorua and Napier. This service was discontinued in 2009. Sunair returned to Whangārei in 2015 with a Whangārei to Whitianga via Claris service. This service ceased at the end of 2015 after low patronage. Sunair currently operates scheduled services from Whangarei to Great Barrier, Hamilton, and Tauranga, as well as providing flight training.

In 2008, Salt Air begun an "xpress" service between Kerikeri, Whangārei and Auckland. These flights landed at North Shore and transferred passengers to Auckland CBD within 60 minutes of leaving Whangārei. This service was sold in 2012 to Flight Hauraki and ceased shortly after.

A runway upgrade in 2009 allowed Bombardier Q300 and weight restricted ATR 72 aircraft to use the airport.

In 2011, a Mount Cook Airline ATR 72 landed at Whangārei Airport becoming the first of its kind to do so.  The aircraft was on charter from Gisborne.

From April 2015, Air New Zealand removed all Beech 1900D flights from the Whangārei schedule as well as dropping the direct to Wellington service. Flights to and from Auckland were taken over by larger Q300 aircraft and it became the sole aircraft type flying to Whangārei for Air New Zealand.

Airport growth and future

In 2009, airport passenger and flight numbers increased steadily to reach a peak of ten return flights to Auckland and two return flights to Wellington on weekdays. This resulted in the airport's capacity reaching around 140,000 passenger movements per year.  However this growth stalled due to global economic downturn and capacity and frequency subsequently reduced.

A project costing $1.5 million to create a 30m takeoff starter extension and reseal the runway was completed in April 2009. The upgrade allowed larger aircraft to land and allowed Air New Zealand, through its subsidiary airline Air Nelson, to trial flights with its Bombardier Q300 aircraft. Daily flights from Auckland commenced in August 2013, growing in time to be the predominant aircraft used on the Auckland route before becoming the sole aircraft used in 2014. In August 2011, the previously weight restricted ATR 72 aircraft made its first commercial service to Whangārei Airport on charter from Gisborne, however the aircraft type has not returned since.

On 30 June 2015 an upgrade to the airport costing $1.02 million was announced. The aircraft taxiway was expanded to accommodate larger aircraft as well as improvements to pathways outside the terminal and the taxi stand. A second airport entry was constructed and the car park was extended with a barrier arm installed. Improvements within the terminal included more seating for passengers, upgraded toilets and an expanded internal baggage claim area. Work began in July 2015 with the last of the upgrades completed by mid-September 2016. The work enabled the airport to be kept to an acceptable and modern standard for the next 15 years when possible relocation of the airport may take place.

Whangārei District Council is investigating moving the airport as the current site is too small to expand significantly to meet requirements for larger aircraft. A runway length of between 1200m and 1350m is needed to accommodate aircraft likely to be in use beyond the next ten to fifteen years. A site at Mata, south of Whangārei was considered but deemed too far from central Whangārei to be viable. Another site at the former location of Port Whangārei was mooted in 2014 but a move is not considered likely due to operational requirements and cost. 

On 5th December 2020, Whangārei District Council announced it had paid $7 million for a piece of land northwest of Whangārei as a possible future site for a new airport. This land was purchased as a way of “future-proofing” council assets for relocating the airport when the time arises. In March 2021 the Whangārei District Council was investigating three posisble sites, and seeking $150 million in government funding for the move.

Airlines and destinations

Airport services

The airport has a modern air-conditioned terminal building with free wifi and a cafeteria (called The Apron), which services Air New Zealand. The terminal includes a glass walk-through tunnel to protect passengers from the weather when accessing the tarmac parking gates 1 and 2. The airport terminal has secure parking and three rental car companies.

Whangārei District Airport no longer has an Aero Club after a drop in membership and private flying. Flight training using micro-light aircraft is still available through the Whangārei Flying Club, which merged with the Northern District Aeroclub when it closed down. General aviation training is available through Sunair. Helicopter operators Skywork and Twin Coast Helicopters both operate from the airport. One aircraft maintenance facility, Northland Aeromaintenance Ltd, is available, which conducts maintenance for aircraft across Northland.  Private jets are catered for when they arrive, as well as larger group charters.
 
BP provide Jet A1 and AVGAS on field for aviators. Since 2006, an AWIB (Aerodrome Weather Information Broadcast) system has been broadcast on 119.8.

Incidents and accidents

19 November 1955: A Tiger Moth owned by the Northland Districts Aero Club crashed into Whangārei Harbour and two people were injured.  ZK-BEC was written off but was shortly after replaced by another Tiger Moth.
29 September 1957: A Waco owned also by Northland Districts Aero Club crashed into Whangārei Harbour after suffering an engine failure after take-off.
3 February 1965: A Victa Airtourer overshot the runway while attempting to land in drizzling rain. The aircraft ended up bouncing off the roof of a private property and destroying a greenhouse. The pilot was uninjured but the aircraft was extensively damaged. 
22 November 2005: A PAC Fletcher top dressing plane en route to Whangārei Airport crashed 5 km west of Whangārei in the Pukenui Forest due to loss of the vertical stabiliser. Both the pilot and his passenger were killed.
9 February 2007: A Robinson R22 helicopter training at Whangārei Airport crash landed in Whangārei Harbour. Both people on board were uninjured. The drive belt for the rotor was believed to have failed resulting in the accident.
2 July 2010: A Cessna 172 leased by Skydive Ballistic Blondes crashed onto Church St at the beginning of runway 24 due to an engine failure on approach. The pilot was uninjured but the aircraft was extensively damaged.

Photo gallery

See also

 Eagle Airways
 List of airports in New Zealand
 Onerahi
 Transport in New Zealand

References

External links

Whangārei Airport Website

Airports in New Zealand
Buildings and structures in Whangārei
Transport buildings and structures in the Northland Region